Ang Misyon: A Marawi Siege Story is a 2018 Filipino war drama film directed by Ceasar Soriano. In the film, Sajid Tumawil, a Muslim nurse and a terrorist sympathizer, was discovered by the military to be a member of the extremist group. The film was released in the Philippines on May 30, 2018, and it received mixed reviews from the critics, citing its poor narrative and acting.

Cast 

 Martin Escudero
 Rez Cortez
 Lou Veloso
 Jordan Castillo
 Tanya Gomez
 Darius Razon
 China Roces
 Juan Miguel Soriano
 Jack Falcis
 Bong Russo
 Ceasar Soriano
 Al Flores
 John Michael Wagnon
 Mia Mendiola
 Chamberlaine Uy

References

External links 

2018 films
2010s action war films
Star Cinema films
Philippine action war films